Umueri, also known and pronounced as Umuleri, is an ancient town in the Anambra State of Southeastern Nigeria. The people of Umueri belong to the Igbo ethnic group, and the town has an estimated population of 1,500,000. It is located within the Anambra Valley, bordered by the Anambra River (Omabala River) and Anam communities in the north, Nteje to the south, Aguleri and Nando  in the east and Nsugbe in the western flank.
The forebears are widely acknowledged as the first settler in Omambala valley. Umueri has three main quarters: Ezi Umueri , Ifite Umueri, and Ikenga Umueri.

The arrival of orient oil and petroleum to Anambra state was a great blessing to south East as a whole and Umueri as a town benefited so much.  The building of Anambra International Airport located at Ifite Umueri was one of the greatest investment of our time. A project which attracted federal government presence to this town. This Airport had her first flight in December 2021. Amongst its benefit to the community where the manifest large infrastructure invested in the establishing a befitting aviation industry serves the Airport as well as Umueri community as a whole. Such infrastructure like road networks, and others were made to link major quarters of the community. The hope that the Airport service structures will benefit the massive unemployed youths of Umueri community is a white hope.

Division and administration 

Traditionally, Umueri is broadly divided into 3 clans: Ezi, Ikenga, Ivite. The clans are further divided into villages and sub-villages. But with advent of colonialism and modernization, the town has consciously grown  and governed just like other Igbo communities. The three traditional clans of Umueri are written down below with their corresponding Villages:
Ezi Umueri: Belongs to Nneyi Village which is also divided into further sub-villages
Ikenga Umueri: Comprises Ugume, Umudiana, Umunchezi, etc.
Ivite Umueri: Umuatuolu, Ogbu and Mgbede

The pre-colonial Umueri government was a republican but with influence of Bini Kingdom in Umueri land, it changes to Monarchical in nature in which the Eze resided in Ivite. The Prime Minister (Onowu) & Ajie in Ikenga and Ezi respectively. Modern administration since colonization relegated this system and enthroned the Igwe Dynasty which is prevalent Institution till date.

The Igwe dynasty has come to stay including but not limited to the performance of basic traditional rites. The Ofala Festival is traditionally performed by one who holds the title of Oke-ebo, the traditional ruler. The New Yam Festival is performed by the Onowu, Ajie and ``Igwe Oke-ebo``

Below is the Structure of Present Umueri Administration:

 Igwe in-Council - The Traditional Ruler and his Cabinet[Igwe Cabinet]
 Council of Elders [Ndichie] - The Elders of the Community
 Umuotu - An Elite Age Grade that helps in implementing laws in the Community
 Town Union - Umuleri General Assembly [UGA]

Religion 

Prior to the coming of Europeans, Umueri people practiced traditional religion with the worship of various deities. However, they had since embraced Christianity about a century ago. Today, there are more than 85% Christians in the town. The major Christian faiths are the Catholic and Anglican denominations.

Some other churches, especially of the Pentecostal faith, have emerged in Umueri in the past fifty years. The town is also referred to as a pinnacle of Anglican evangelism as it has one of the oldest churches east of the Niger. Churches that are bound in the town include and not limited to the following: St Immanuel Anglican Church (founded 1904), St Gabriel Anglican Church (1912), Our Lady of Victory Catholic Church (1975), St Marks Catholic Church Nneyi etc.

Infrastructure 

Most of the public basic infrastructure in the town is built by the community. The community-built infrastructures are as follow: Umueri township stadium, Umuer First Bank Plc, Umueri Police institute of finance and administration, Umueri Inec Office, Umueri General Hospital, Umueri Town Hall, Recreation Club House, Umueri Girls High School, Ugume Umueri, Umueri High School, Obinetiti (formerly Umueri Technical College), Community Secondary School, Umuatuolu, Umueri Development School, Nneyi, Umueri Postal Agency, Umueri Community Bank, Afiama Market, Eke Market, Nkwo Nneyi Market, etc.

The few infrastructure owned by government includes the following: Umueri Nomadi School at Umudiana-Umueri, Umueri Head Bridge, Umueri Civic Center, Umueri Library and Skill Acquisition Center, Umueri International Airport etc.

Climate

References 

Biafra Diboh's Blogs- AkukoEri
Tochukwu Henry  "Incipience of Migration"
Nwabunwanne Ifediorah Christopher. “Umueri Head of Ancient Umueri Clan”
Nwabunwanne Ifediorah Christopher. "Anambra Day Break Series"
Tochukwu Henry Chidebelu. "The Abode Series"
Isichei Elizabeth. “A History of Igbo People” (London, ENGLAND: MacMillan, 1976.)
Patrick Chidalu Chukwuma. "The Okebo City of Nigeria"
Patrick Chidalu Chukwuma. "Okebo City Portal" (Bachelor Computer Science, University of Wollongong Australia

Populated places in Anambra State